The Hartford Connecticut Temple is a temple of the Church of Jesus Christ of Latter-day Saints (LDS Church) in Farmington, Connecticut.  It is the first LDS temple in Connecticut and the second in New England, following the Boston Massachusetts Temple.

The temple is located at the intersection of Melrose Drive and Farmington Avenue.

History

On October 3, 1992, during the afternoon session of the church's 162nd Semiannual general conference, Gordon B. Hinckley, First Counselor in the First Presidency, announced plans for a temple in Hartford. However, three years later, plans for this temple were replaced with plans for the Boston and White Plains New York temples (later to be renamed the  Harrison New York Temple).

In the October 1995 general conference, Hinckley explained,

Hinckley apologized to the members of Hartford, who had joyed in the announcement of this temple, by saying,

After construction on the temple in Boston was complete, it was dedicated on October 1, 2000. However, construction of a temple in White Plains, on a 24-acre site for the temple at the intersection of Interstate 287 and Hutchinson River Parkway, was never started and eventually suspended. Reportedly, efforts had been underway until 2004, but construction was delayed by lawsuits and objections by local officials, and this temple was removed from the list on the church's official temple website soon after the Manhattan New York Temple dedication.

Second announced 

On October 2, 2010, during the church's general conference, church president Thomas S. Monson announced plans for the construction of a temple in Hartford, 18 years after the original announcement by Hinckley.

In May 2012, the church released a rendering of the temple and announced it would be built in Farmington. The temple was planned to be approximately 25,000 square feet and the site plan was approved by the town planning and zoning commission in June 2012.

Groundbreaking 

Ground was broken for the new temple by Monson on August 17, 2013.

Open house and dedication 

A public open house was held from September 30 through October 22, 2016, excluding October 1 and Sundays. The temple was dedicated by Henry B. Eyring on November 20, 2016.

Award
In 2018, Architectural Digest chose the temple as the most beautiful place of worship in Connecticut.

See also

 Comparison of temples of The Church of Jesus Christ of Latter-day Saints
 List of temples of The Church of Jesus Christ of Latter-day Saints
 List of temples of The Church of Jesus Christ of Latter-day Saints by geographic region
 Temple architecture (Latter-day Saints)
 The Church of Jesus Christ of Latter-day Saints in Connecticut

References

External links
Hartford Connecticut Temple Official site
Hartford Connecticut Temple at ChurchofJesusChristTemples.org



21st-century Latter Day Saint temples
Farmington, Connecticut
Religious buildings and structures in Connecticut
Temples (LDS Church) in the United States
Religious buildings and structures completed in 2016
2016 establishments in Connecticut